

The American Airmotive NA-75 was an agricultural aircraft marketed in the United States in the 1960s, created by remanufacturing military surplus Boeing Stearman trainers.  The aircraft were fitted with completely new, high-lift wings, and one of the cockpits was replaced by a chemical hopper. As of 1980, over 200 Stearmans had been modified in this way, either by American Airmotive directly, or via conversion kits that the company sold.

Specifications

References

 
 

Biplanes
Single-engined tractor aircraft
1950s United States agricultural aircraft
NA-75